Santa Monica Boulevard is a major west–east thoroughfare in Los Angeles County. It runs from Ocean Avenue in Santa Monica near the Pacific Ocean to Sunset Boulevard at Sunset Junction in Los Angeles. It passes through Beverly Hills and West Hollywood. A portion of it is designated as California State Route 2.

Route description

The western terminus of Santa Monica Boulevard is at Ocean Avenue near the Pacific Ocean.  From there until the San Diego Freeway (Interstate 405), Santa Monica Boulevard is a densely urban commercial street.  It assumes the designation California State Route 2 between Centinela Avenue at the Santa Monica–Los Angeles border, and the Hollywood Freeway (U.S. Route 101). The portion between Centinela Avenue and Lincoln Boulevard in Santa Monica was also originally part of California State Route 2. From Centinela Avenue, Santa Monica Boulevard heads northeast through the wealthy areas of West Los Angeles, Westwood, Century City, and Beverly Hills before entering the decidedly urban West Hollywood.  Santa Monica Boulevard, being a major street, is for most of its length at least four lanes wide. Most of the Westside car dealerships are located on Santa Monica Boulevard. 

After Sepulveda Boulevard, Santa Monica Boulevard passes by Century City and its shopping center, and intersects with Wilshire Boulevard in Beverly Hills. After intersecting with Wilshire in Beverly Hills, Santa Monica Boulevard continues northeast towards West Hollywood, spanning Beverly Boulevard and Melrose Avenue.  At Holloway Drive, in the middle of West Hollywood, Santa Monica, now north of Melrose Avenue turns to run east. In West Hollywood, between Doheny Drive and Fairfax Avenue along Santa Monica Boulevard, bronze name plaques are embedded in the sidewalks as part of the West Hollywood Memorial Walk. The original southern end of California State Route 170 was at the intersection with Highland Avenue.  Santa Monica Boulevard merges on its eastern end with Sunset Boulevard in the Sunset Junction neighborhood of Silver Lake.

The south roadway of Santa Monica Boulevard, often called Little Santa Monica Boulevard in Beverly Hills, runs parallel to the state highway (north) roadway of Santa Monica Boulevard from the city's west limit to Rexford Drive. After Rexford Drive, Little Santa Monica turns east, becoming Burton Way. Burton Way merges into San Vicente Boulevard at its intersection with La Cienega Boulevard. It is noted that the south roadway of Santa Monica Boulevard in Beverly Hills is a city street while the north roadway of Santa Monica Boulevard is a California state highway, each roadway handling bi-directional traffic.

2020 protests
On May 31, 2020, local protests following the murder of George Floyd turned into riots which saw numerous buildings vandalized, looted and burned along Santa Monica Boulevard, with the most visible destruction being at the site of the popular Japanese-themed restaurant Sake House. Wexler's Deli co-owner Mike Kassar stated to Eater that "Basically every food and beverage establishment for ten blocks got trashed".

Transportation
Metro Local line 4 and Santa Monica Transit Line 1 serve Santa Monica Boulevard, with the latter serving the boulevard in West Los Angeles and Santa Monica. A portion of West Hollywood-operated The PickUp operates on Santa Monica Boulevard in West Hollywood. The Metro B Line serves an underground station on Santa Monica Boulevard at its intersection with Vermont Avenue.

External links

References

Streets in Los Angeles
Streets in Santa Monica, California
Boulevards in the United States
Streets in Beverly Hills, California
Century City, Los Angeles
Streets in Hollywood, Los Angeles
West Los Angeles
Streets in West Hollywood, California
Westwood, Los Angeles
Westside (Los Angeles County)